Gornje Psarjevo is a village in central Croatia, located south of Sveti Ivan Zelina. The population is 311 (census 2011).

References

Populated places in Zagreb County